David José Kohon (18 October 1929; Buenos Aires – 30 October 2004; ibid.) was an Argentine film director and screenwriter.

He directed and wrote for Argentine films between 1958 and 1982 directing films such as Así o de otra manera (1964), Breve cielo (1969), Con alma y vida  (1970) and El Agujero en la pared (1982). Breve cielo was entered into the 6th Moscow International Film Festival.

Filmography

Director:
El agujero en la pared (1982)
¿Qué es el otoño? (1977)
Con alma y vida (1970)
Breve cielo (1969)
Así o de otra manera (1964)
Tres veces Ana (1961)
Prisioneros de una noche (1960)
Buenos Aires (short - 1958)
La flecha y el compás (short - 1950)
Writer:
El agujero en la pared (1982)
¿Qué es el otoño? (1977)
Con alma y vida (1970)
Breve cielo (1969)
Así o de otra manera or Confesión (1964)
Tres veces Ana (1961)
Buenos Aires (short - 1958)
La Madre María (1974)

References

External links
 

1929 births
2004 deaths
Argentine film directors
Jewish Argentine writers
Male screenwriters
Writers from Buenos Aires
20th-century Argentine screenwriters
20th-century Argentine male writers